Sonerila margaritacea is a species of flowering plant in the genus Sonerila, native to Myanmar. An evergreen perennial with patterned leaves, reaching only 10cm, it has gained the Royal Horticultural Society's Award of Garden Merit as a terrarium or hothouse ornamental.

References

Melastomataceae
Endemic flora of Myanmar
Plants described in 1854